The Boullanger Island dunnart (Sminthopsis boullangerensis) is a species of dunnart found only on Boullanger Island, Western Australia. It was formerly considered a subspecies of the grey-bellied dunnart (S. griseoventer), for which reason it was not assessed by the IUCN in 2008 (although it was classed as critically endangered in the 1996 list). The EPBC Act classifies the Boullanger Island dunnart as vulnerable.

See also
 Boullanger Island

References

Dasyuromorphs
Mammals of Western Australia
Marsupials of Australia
Mammals described in 1999